The Dormition Cathedral is an Albanian Orthodox church in the Berat Castle in Berat, Albania, dedicated to the Dormition of the Theotokos. It is a Cultural Monument of Albania since 1948. Since 1986, the Onufri Museum of Icons is located in the church.

References

Cultural Monuments of Albania
Churches in Berat